The First National Bank of Davenport, also known as Brenton Bank and The Brenton, is an historic building located in central Davenport, Iowa, United States.  It was added to the National Register of Historic Places in 2018.

History
The three-story Modern Movement building was constructed in 1967 for the First National Bank of Davenport, a branch of Iowa's Brenton Bank network. It was designed to harmonize with other Mid-century modern buildings in a larger commercial development. In the event, plans changed, and The Brenton was self-financed independently of its neighbours.

The building is significant for its embrace of New Formalism architecture. The Brenton and the Davenport Public Library building downtown are considered to be the most important examples of the style in the city. The Brenton exemplifies the shift from historical revival styles and the more restricted expressions of Modernism. Its architects  emphasized the building's structure and construction grid by placing it on an elevated base. Its concrete and steel frame structure was designed by the local firm of Stewart-Robison-Laffan.

After the bank discontinued its operations, the building was acquired by the Davenport Community School District for its offices and other programs. In July 2018, the District moved its operations into a former school building across the street. Newbury Living of West Des Moines, Iowa then began converting the building into a mixed-use project. Their $6.7 million transformation of The Brenton into a block of thirty-eight apartments was completed in 2020. The apartments are located on the second and third floors of the building; the first floor is an open public gathering space. What used to be the vault of the bank has been made into a gaming room.

References

Office buildings completed in 1967
Modernist architecture in Iowa
Buildings and structures in Davenport, Iowa
Bank buildings on the National Register of Historic Places in Iowa
National Register of Historic Places in Davenport, Iowa